Romania participated in the Eurovision Song Contest 2007 in Helsinki, Finland. They selected their entry, "Liubi, Liubi, I Love You" by Romanian group Todomondo through the national selection competition Selecția Națională 2007 in February 2007. Controversy surrounded the event, as Romanian Television (TVR) disqualified several entries over the course of the competition. Prior to the 2007 contest, Romania had participated in the Eurovision Song Contest nine times since its first entry in 1994. Its highest placing in the contest had been third place, which the nation achieved in 2005. In 2006, Romania finished in fourth place. Prior to Eurovision, "Liubi, Liubi, I Love You" was promoted by a music video and a promotional tour in Belarus. Todomondo ultimately achieved 13th place in the contest's Grand Final on 12 May 2007, scoring 84 points. Their performance saw the use of pyrotechnics.

Before Eurovision

Selecția Națională 2007

Competing entries and shows

Romanian Television (TVR) organized Selecția Națională 2007, a competition to select their entrant for the Eurovision Song Contest 2007. In early January 2007, the broadcaster published a provisory list of 24 songs shortlisted to compete in the two semi-finals of Selecția Națională on 27 January and 3 February, and the final on 10 February. They were selected on 17 January, out of 259 entries submitted to TVR until 15 January, by a jury panel consisting of music and entertainment professionals Ionel Tudor, Cornel Fugaru, Adi Despot, Dan Teodorescu, Mihai Ogășanu, Șerban Huidu and Titus Andrei.

"Do the Tango with Me", "Liubi, Liubi, I Love You" and "Love Is All You Need" were appointed by TVR as replacement songs for the voluntarily withdrawn entries "Hungry for Love" and "Prinde-mă, aprinde-mă" by Andreea Bălan, as well as for "Gozalo" by Mandinga. The results in each show of Selecția Națională were determined by a 50/50 combination of votes from a jury panel—made up alternately of Andrei Partoş, Titus Munteanu, Gabriel Cotabiţă, Ogăşanu, Despot, Andrei Tudor, Teodorescu, Titus Andrei, Mirela Fugaru, Horia Moculescu, Cristian Faur, Mihai Georgescu, Sorin Vasile and Ionuț Radu—and a public televote. Cătălin Măruță and 3rei Sud Est were hired as hosts. Due to multiple requests from observers, TVR decided to establish a commission on 5 February to analyse several entries in regards to their compliance to the competition's regulations.

Semi-final 1

Interval acts for the first semi-final on 27 January included covers of the past Eurovision Song Contest entries "Volare" (Italy 1958), "Congratulations" (United Kingdom 1968), "What's Another Year" (Ireland 1980), "Diva" (Israel 1998) and "Everyway That I Can" (Turkey 2003) performed by Romanian artists such as Luminița Anghel and Taxi. Additionally, a boxing match between Anghel and native actress Luiza took place. Although scheduled to be performed in the fifth position at Selecția Națională, "Make-It" by Giulia Nahmany was disqualified due to accusations of plagiarising "Risin'" (2004) by Natalia. Todomondo, Rednex and Ro-Mania, and Morandi and Wassabi made up the top three of the televote. The results of the semi-final were:

Semi-final 2

The second semi-final on 3 February had a television audience of 5,511,000 viewers and similarly had several covers of past Eurovision entries as interval acts, alongside another boxing match between two native celebrities. Although initially assigned to this semi-final, "Love Struck" by Indiggo was disqualified because the duo failed to attend rehearsals. Simplu and Andra were the televote's favorites, gathering more than 10,000 votes and around 8,000 more than the follow-up. The results of the event were:

{| class="wikitable sortable plainrowheaders" style="margin: 1em auto 1em auto; text-align:center"
|-
|+ Semi-final 23 February 2007
|-
! scope="col" | Draw
! scope="col" | Artist
! scope="col" | Song
! scope="col" | Result
|-
! scope="row" style="text-align:center;" | 1
| style="text-align:left" | Moni-K
| style="text-align:left" | "În lumea mea"
| Eliminated
|- style="font-weight:bold; background:navajowhite;"
! scope="row" style="text-align:center; background:navajowhite;" | 2
| style="text-align:left" | Simplu and Andra
| style="text-align:left" | "Dracula, My Love"
| Advanced
|- style="font-weight:bold; background:navajowhite;"
! scope="row" style="text-align:center; background:navajowhite;" | 3
| style="text-align:left" | '| style="text-align:left" | "Nu pot să uit"
| Advanced
|-
! scope="row" style="text-align:center;" | 4
| style="text-align:left" | Nico
| style="text-align:left" | "Love Is All You Need"
| Eliminated
|-
! scope="row" style="text-align:center;" | 5
| style="text-align:left" | Celia
| style="text-align:left" | "Șoapte"
| Eliminated
|-
! scope="row" style="text-align:center;" | 6
| style="text-align:left" | Ada
| style="text-align:left" | "You and Me"
| Eliminated
|-
! scope="row" style="text-align:center;" | 7
| style="text-align:left" | Wassabi
| style="text-align:left" | "Do the Tango with Me"
| Eliminated
|- style="font-weight:bold; background:navajowhite;"
! scope="row" style="text-align:center; background:navajowhite;" | 8
| style="text-align:left" | Desperado and Tony Poptămaș
| style="text-align:left" | "European – a Beautiful Sin"
| Advanced
|- style="font-weight:bold; background:navajowhite;"
! scope="row" style="text-align:center; background:navajowhite;" | 9
| style="text-align:left" | Provincialii
| style="text-align:left" | "Time"
| Advanced
|- style="font-weight:bold; background:navajowhite;"
! scope="row" style="text-align:center; background:navajowhite;" | 10
| style="text-align:left" | Trupa Veche
| style="text-align:left" | "Deci 20"
| Advanced
|- style="font-weight:bold; background:navajowhite;"
! scope="row" style="text-align:center; background:navajowhite;" | 11
| style="text-align:left" | 
| style="text-align:left" | "No poder vivir"
| Advanced
|}

Final

Romanian group Sistem presented their single "Soare" as an interval act during the final of Selecția Națională on 10 February. "Dracula, My Love" by Simplu and Andra had been falsely suspected for plagiarising "When Religion Comes to Town" (1994) by E-Type, but was ultimately disqualified from the competition for having been partially performed by Simplu at the MTV Romania Music Awards 2006 prior to TVR's cutoff date of 1 October 2006. Similarly, New Effect and Moni-K's "Sinada" was disqualified for having received local radio airplay prior to the aforementioned date.

In addition, it was discovered that "Well-o-wee" by Rednex and Ro-Mania was a modified version of "Călușul", a song on the latter's 2001 album Lasă-mă să beau. This led to the entry's exclusion from Selecția Națională'', alongside "Crazy" by Morandi and Wassabi, who failed to attend rehearsals. According to Marius Moga, the latter was a boycott due to the disqualification of "Dracula, My Love". The mass disqualification of songs generated controversy among observers. "Liubi, Liubi, I Love You" by Todomondo emerged as the winner, gathering the maximum 12 points from the public (11,243 televotes) and ten from the jury. The full results were as follows:

At Eurovision

To promote "Liubi, Liubi, I Love You" as Romania's Eurovision entry, a CD single was released in 2007 by TVR, followed by a promotional tour in Belarus. Additionally, Todomondo released a Dan Maoliu-directed music video and launched their own website in April 2007, in order to interact with fans and present them with news and biographical information. The Eurovision Song Contest 2007 took place at the Hartwall Arena in Helsinki, Finland and consisted of one semi-final on 10 May and the final on 12 May 2007. According to the then-Eurovision rules, selected countries, except the host nation and the "Big Four" (France, Germany, Spain and the United Kingdom), were required to qualify from the semi-final to compete for the final; the top ten countries from the semi-final progressed to the final.

In Romania, the show was broadcast on TVR, with Manoliu as the country's head of delegation. Todomondo were scheduled for technical rehearsals on 7 and 8 May, experiencing considerable malfunctions with the sound and graphics. Manoliu stated: "If the stage and the camera work will not fit our requirements, despite our efforts to help the team implement [them], we do not exclude the possibility of withdrawing from the competition". Automatically qualified for the final due to Romania's top ten placement the previous year, the group performed 20th on the occasion, preceded by the United Kingdom and followed by Bulgaria. Their show made use of pyrotechnics worth €5,000.

Voting
Below is a breakdown of points awarded to Romania in the Grand Final, as well as by the country in the semi-final and Grand Final of the contest. On the latter occasion, Romania finished in 13th position, being awarded a total of 84 points including 12 awarded by both Moldova and Spain, ten by Andorra and eight by Hungary. The country awarded its 12 points to Moldova in the semi-final and Grand Final of the contest. For the announcement of the points, Andreea Marin Bănică was the Romanian spokesperson announcing the country's voting results.

Points awarded to Romania

Points awarded by Romania

Notes

References

2007
Countries in the Eurovision Song Contest 2007
Eurovision